Zipunovo is a rural locality (a selo) and the administrative center of Zipunovskoye Rural Settlement, Chaykovsky, Perm Krai, Russia. The population was 568 as of 2010. There are 5 streets.

Geography 
Zipunovo is located 38 km southeast of Chaykovsky. Nekrasovo is the nearest rural locality.

References 

Rural localities in Chaykovsky urban okrug